Elena Møller Rigas, born 29 January 1996 in Albertslund is a Danish inline and speed skater. She was  selected as flag-bearer for Denmark at the opening ceremony of the 2018 Winter Olympics. She participated in the women's mass start.

Biography

Rigas started out as a roller skater in the Kongens Enghave district of Copenhagen in 2000. The following year she joined Vesterbro Rulleskøjteklub but moved to Vallensbæk Rulleskøjteklub in 2005.  She participated three times in the European roller skating championships before taking up ice skating. At the 2015 Junior European Roller Skating Championships in Wörgl, Austria, she won three gold, a silver and a bronze medal.

Personal records 
Rigas has achieved the following personal records in speed skating:

References

External links 
 

1996 births
Living people
Danish female speed skaters
People from Albertslund Municipality
Olympic speed skaters of Denmark
Speed skaters at the 2018 Winter Olympics
Sportspeople from the Capital Region of Denmark